2016 was the first year in the history of the ILFJ, a Japanese Lethwei promotion. The events were broadcast through television agreements with regional channels in Japan.

List of events

Lethwei Grand Prix Japan 2016

Lethwei Grand Prix Japan 2016 was the first Lethwei event held by the ILFJ on October 27, 2016 at the Korakuen Hall in Tokyo, Japan.

Background
This event featured top Lethwei fighters Tun Tun Min, Too Too and Soe Lin Oo to inaugurate the first event of the promotion.

Results

See also
2016 in K-1 
2016 in Kunlun Fight

References

International Lethwei Federation Japan events
2016 in Lethwei
2016 in kickboxing